Cham-e Berkeh is a village in Jam Rural District, in the Central District of Jam County, Bushehr Province, Iran. At the 2006 census, its population was 23, in 6 families.

References 

Populated places in Jam County